The Dhuandhar Falls (धुआंधार) is a waterfall in Jabalpur district in the Indian state of Madhya Pradesh.

Etymology
The word 'Dhuandhar' is derived from two Hindi words - Dhuan (smoke) and Dhar (flow), meaning a waterfall where one can feel a smoky atmosphere (this smoke is formed by water vapour or the smoke cascade).

The Falls
The Dhuandhar Falls is located on the Narmada River in Bhedaghat and are 30 meters high. The Narmada River, making its way through the world-famous Marble Rocks, narrows down and then plunges into a waterfall known as Dhuandhar. The plunge, which creates a bouncing mass of mist, is so powerful that its roar can be heard from a far distance.

The best time to visit Dhuandhar Falls is during Sharad Purnima, when Narmada Mahotsava is celebrated. The white marble rocks appear spectacular when the moonlight falls on them, rendering them a silvery appearance. Boating is available at Dhuandhar Falls.
A ropeway to the falls has been created, presenting a magnificent view from the top making it one of the finest falls near Jabalpur.

Cable car service at Dhuandhar Waterfalls
One can access Dhuandhar waterfalls from the east bank as well as the west bank of the Narmada river. To view the other side of Dhuandhar Falls, one must take the cable car service available at Bhedaghat. The ropeway facility starts from the east bank of the Narmada river, crosses the river and then drops tourists off at the west bank of the river.

Gallery

References

 

 Waterfalls of Madhya Pradesh
Panna district
 Tourist attractions in Jabalpur district